Myroliubiv, until May 2016 Zhovtneve, is an urban-type settlement in Korosten Raion, Zhytomyr Oblast, Ukraine. Population:  In 2001, population was 671.

On 21 May 2016, Verkhovna Rada adopted decision to rename Zhovtneve to Myroliubiv according to the law prohibiting names of Communist origin.

References

Urban-type settlements in Korosten Raion